Primavera Sound (commonly referred to as simply Primavera) is an annual music festival held in Parc del Fòrum in Barcelona, Spain that takes place between the end of May and beginning of June. The first edition took place in 2001 in Poble Espanyol and moved to the Parc del Fòrum, a much larger site on the seafront, in 2005. The nature of the festival (urban and an integrated part of the city) and the wide range of bands represented have made Primavera Sound a meeting point for artists and spectators from all generations. Primavera Sound is one of the largest and most-attended music festivals in Europe and the biggest in the Mediterranean.

The success of the festival led to an expansion to Porto in 2012. This one takes place at the Parque da Cidade a week after the main edition. In 2022, the festival hosted its first editions in Los Angeles, Santiago de Chile, Buenos Aires and São Paulo. The 2023 edition will be the first to feature a nearly identical lineup in Madrid. A much smaller version of the festival, Primavera Weekender, has been taking place in Benidorm each November since 2019.

The festival's image was originally oriented around indie rock, but in recent years has seen a larger presence of genres such as hip hop, electronic dance music and pop. In contrast to most other European festivals, traditionally the first bands go on at 4:00 pm, the headliners begin at midnight, and the latest acts play until 6:00 a.m.

The artists who have headlined the main Primavera Sound edition in Barcelona multiple times are Pulp, Sonic Youth, Wilco, Spiritualized, Yo La Tengo, Pixies, PJ Harvey, The Flaming Lips, Belle and Sebastian, My Bloody Valentine, The National, Patti Smith, Interpol, The xx, Arcade Fire, Björk, Nick Cave and the Bad Seeds, Pavement, Tame Impala, The Strokes, Phoenix, Blur, New Order, Kendrick Lamar and Rosalía.

At every edition the event has grown both in terms of numbers and in terms of media exposure: press, radio and television both nationally and internationally. Its first edition in 2001 closed with an attendance of 8,000 people, an audience that by the latest edition in 2022 had become 500,000.

History

2001–2004: Beginnings at Poble Espanyol 

Although Primavera Sound had existed in a small format in Barcelona since the 1990s, 2001 saw the first bigger event take place at the Poble Espanyol with more than one stage and attracted around 7,700 people. This venue is an open air architectural museum up the Montjuïc hill. It recreates the best and most famous venues and cultures within Spain.The bill included the likes of Armand Van Helden, Le Hammond Inferno, former main man of Pizzicato 5, Yasuharu Konishi, Faze Action, Bent, Los Planetas, Manta Ray, Sr. Chinarro, Samuel L. Session, Unkle, Carl Craig, DJ Godfather; and many other bands and DJs like Gentle People Djs, Leila, Zip and Gus Gus Djs.In 2002 Primavera Sound took place on 17 and 18 May. The main change was the addition of a second day to the festival. Sixty local and international bands and DJs played on five different stages that year, including Pulp, Tindersticks, Spiritualized, Echo & The Bunnymen, J Mascis, Aphex Twin, Luke Slater, Giant Sand, The Delgados, Dave Clarke, Bis, Ian Pooley, Andrew Weatherall, Le Tigre, Gonzales, The Moldy Peaches, Chicks On Speed, Clem Snide, La Buena Vida, Green Velvet, Cinerama, Lo-Fidelity Allstars and The Zephyrs. 2002 was also the first year to include non-musical performances.

In 2003, attendance improved to 24,200, and the number of acts also increased to more than 90 groups and DJs, both local and international. Five areas were arranged at the Poble Espanyol site for the night shows (Nitsa-Apolo, Rockdelux by Lois, CD Drome, Nasti and Psicolabis).
An extra site was added to the festival: Mercat de les Flors, for the day time activities: the Primavera Soundtrack Film Festival and the Record label Fair, which included two stages (acoustic and electric) where the label's bands showcased their works. The headliners were Belle and Sebastian, Mogwai, Sonic Youth and Television; the lineup also featured Arab Strap, El-P, The Folk Implosion, The Go-Betweens, Julian Cope, Teenage Fanclub, The White Stripes and Yo La Tengo, among others.

In 2004 the festival kept growing in length (three days in the Poble Espanyol), artists and attendance. Attendance increased to up to 40,000 people. Headliners included Pixies (playing their first European show in 12 years), PJ Harvey, Primal Scream and Wilco. The size of the simultaneous record label and industry fair also increased, with 30 stands representing the leading independent Spanish record labels, as well as specialized press and associated companies.

2005–2009: Expansion 
In 2005 the festival relocated from the Poble Espanyol to the Fòrum site. This new site was built explicitly for the 2004 Universal Forum of Cultures. It is a 14-hectare multipurpose public park meters away from the Mediterranean Sea. It is best known for its public art, the Museum of Natural Sciences of Barcelona and its underground auditorium, its seaview and solar panels, with the last one becoming one of the emblems of the site. Other points in favour was the proximity to commercial and residential areas of Sant Adrià and Poblenou, which has been described as the "hipster" part of the city, and its great connection with public transport through the Metro Line 4 and the Trambesòs.

2005 saw the first use of the Auditorium building where some of the main performances of that weekend took place, such as Antony & The Johnsons, Vic Chesnutt and Tortoise. Headliners included New Order, Iggy Pop’s Stooges live comeback, Sonic Youth and Steve Earle, with Gang of Four, Mercury Rev, The Human League, Arcade Fire and Tortoise directly underneath.

2006 saw only minor changes in the layout of the stages and some improvements in the infrastructure. The headliners included Motörhead and Yo La Tengo on Thursday, The Flaming Lips, Dinosaur Jr. and Yeah Yeah Yeahs on Friday, and Lou Reed, Violent Femmes and Stereolab on Saturday. Other performers included Animal Collective, Babyshambles, Big Star, Deerhoof, Drive-By Truckers, Killing Joke, Richard Hawley, Shellac, Sleater-Kinney and The Drones.

2007 saw the audience increase to over 60,000 attendees. With thirty per cent of the audience coming from other countries, there were now over 150 acts, headlined by The Smashing Pumpkins, The White Stripes, Wilco, Sonic Youth performing Daydream Nation in full, Patti Smith, Slint performing Spiderland in full and The Fall. Other prominent acts included The Good, the Bad & the Queen, Maxïmo Park, Los Planetas, Spiritualized, Modest Mouse, Buzzcocks, The Durutti Column, Jonathan Richman, Built to Spill, Billy Bragg, Melvins performing Houdini, Low, Blonde Redhead and Isis.

The 2008 edition was headlined by Portishead, MGMT, Public Enemy performing It Takes a Nation of Millions to Hold Us Back, Rufus Wainwright, Cat Power and Bon Iver. Other performers included Tindersticks, The Sonics, Sebadoh, De La Soul, Stephen Malkmus and the Jicks, Young Marble Giants, Mission of Burma, Throbbing Gristle, Model 500, Nick Lowe and Vampire Weekend. It marked the first time that artists performed in club venues across Barcelona in the days leading up to the festival, beginning a traditional which would become known as Primavera a la Ciutat.

2009 saw a total of 171 performers and over 80,000 spectators, headlined by Neil Young, My Bloody Valentine, Sonic Youth, Aphex Twin, Bloc Party, Jarvis Cocker, Yo La Tengo, The Jayhawks and Spiritualized. Parc del Fòrum hosted six stages, while eight additional venues were used across the city of Barcelona. The starting signal was given in various underground stations of the town centre on Saturday 23 May and the usual presentation showcases, organized with the collaboration of different record companies and taking place from Monday the 25th in the Apolo, and Sidecar. The main event took place on the 28th, 29th and 30 May and the second edition of Primavera at the Park (free concerts in the Joan Miró) consolidated itself in 2009 with twelve concerts which prolonged the festival into the Sunday 31 May.

2010–2019: Reaffirmation and internationalization 
2010, the tenth edition, saw over 100,000 spectators attend the festival for the first time, and featured the first edition of PrimaveraPro, a gathering more than 400 music industry professionals from different countries and different areas within the sector such as labels, booking agencies, promoters or festival programmers. The headliners were Pixies, Pavement (in their first tour since 1999), Pet Shop Boys, Wilco and Orbital. They were joined by The Charlatans performing Some Friendly, The Fall, Sunny Day Real Estate, Superchunk, Grizzly Bear, Panda Bear, The xx, Broken Social Scene, Tortoise, Wire, Built to Spill, Gary Numan, Marc Almond, Health, Van Dyke Parks, Florence and the Machine, The New Pornographers, Fuck Buttons, No Age and Atlas Sound among other bands.  

In 2011, attendance grew to over 120,000 people. The headliners were Pulp, PJ Harvey, Grinderman, The Flaming Lips, Animal Collective, Belle & Sebastian, Interpol, The National, Fleet Foxes, Sufjan Stevens, Mogwai, John Cale performing Paris 1919, Mercury Rev performing Deserter's Songs, M. Ward and Low.

The 2012 edition of the festival was headlined by Franz Ferdinand, Wilco, Refused (on their Reunion Tour's first performances since 1998), The xx, Death Cab for Cutie, The Cure, Rufus Wainwright, Björk, Justice and The Weeknd. Attendance was around 117,000 people. In June 2012, the first edition of NOS Primavera Sound took place at the Parque da Cidade in Porto, Portugal. Alberto Guijarro, the festival's director, stated that “after years in Barcelona we organised a first edition in Porto to take advantage of musicians on tour, but it is a different type of event; what we do in Portugal is a Primavera boutique, more well-kept, smaller and with its own personality".2013's headliners were The Postal Service, Phoenix, Blur, The Jesus and Mary Chain, Nick Cave and the Bad Seeds and My Bloody Valentine. The lineup also featured Animal Collective, Grizzly Bear, Tame Impala, The Knife, James Blake, Band of Horses, Wu-Tang Clan and Los Planetas, among 260 acts. There was a new record attendance of 170,000 counting the four days in the Parc del Fòrum and the activities in the framework of Primavera a la Ciutat. The festival was also set to host Fiona Apple's only scheduled performance of the year, but she canceled in April. 

2014 was headlined by Arcade Fire, Queens of the Stone Age, The National, Pixies, Slowdive, Nine Inch Nails and Kendrick Lamar. Slowdive announced their reunion after 19 years of disbandment to play the festival. The main stages were also played by Real Estate, Disclosure, Midlake, Warpaint, X, Haim, !!!, Spoon, Television, Volcano Choir and Foals.

In 2015, the festival was headlined by The Black Keys, Antony and the Johnsons, Alt-J, Patti Smith performing Horses, The Strokes, Ride, Interpol and Underworld performing Dubnobasswithmyheadman. Other performers on the main stages included James Blake, Julian Casablancas & The Voidz, Damien Rice, the reunited Sleater-Kinney, Mac DeMarco and Foxygen. Orchestral Manoeuvres in the Dark headlined a free Wednesday show.

The 2016 festival was headlined by Radiohead, LCD Soundsystem, PJ Harvey and Sigur Rós. Tame Impala, Explosions in the Sky, Air, Beach House, The Last Shadow Puppets, Beirut, Moderat, Deerhunter, Wild Nothing and Brian Wilson's Pet Sounds also played on the main stages. Suede headlined the year's free lead-up Wednesday show. It saw the reunion of The Avalanches, who had not performed live since 2007 or DJ'd since 2011. A new beach stage opened across a bridge at the Sant Adrià de Besòs port focusing on electronic music sets from artists including Sophie and Todd Terje. Consequence of Sound named it the festival of the year.

The 2017 headliners were originally Bon Iver, Aphex Twin, Frank Ocean, The xx, Arcade Fire and Van Morrison. However, Ocean canceled his headlining gig four days before his performance due to "production delays beyond his control", replaced by a Jamie xx DJ set. Arcade Fire, Mogwai and Haim performed secret sets, while Slayer, Miguel, Grace Jones, Run the Jewels and Solange also played on the main stage. More than 200,000 people attended.

In 2018, the headliners were Björk, Nick Cave and the Bad Seeds, The National, Arctic Monkeys, Lorde and A$AP Rocky. Migos were planned to headline but cancelled hours before the performance because they missed their flight, replaced by Skepta and Los Planetas. Artists from 33 countries were booked for the event. Chvrches, The War on Drugs, Alex G, Father John Misty, Tyler, the Creator, Lykke Li and Car Seat Headrest were among the names that also played the main stages.

With the 2019 lineup, the festival's organizers committed to begin a gender-balanced lineup which Primavera advertised as "The New Normal." Female-fronted acts made up over half of the total performers, up from 35% in 2018. The largely female headliners were Erykah Badu, Future, Interpol, Tame Impala, Cardi B, Janelle Monáe, Solange, J Balvin and Rosalía. Cardi B cancelled her appearance due to scheduling conflicts and was replaced by Miley Cyrus, who fully premiered her brand new EP She Is Coming. The festival noted how it featured a "variety of genres that goes from extreme metal to reggaeton." Big Thief, Courtney Barnett, Carly Rae Jepsen, Robyn and Kali Uchis also played the main stages, this year sponsored by SEAT and Pull&Bear. It was attended by over 220,000 people.

2020–present: Pandemic issues and expansion to the Americas 
In November 2019, a smaller edition of the festival named Primavera Weekender began at Magic Robin Hood Camp in Benidorm, attended by over 3,500 people.

On March 10, 2020, the Government of Catalonia ordered the cancellation or rescheduling of cultural events that had an attendance expectation of over a thousand people due to concerns over the COVID-19 pandemic. Thus, the twentieth edition of the Primavera Sound festival was moved to August 2020. However, the festival was later cancelled. The 2020 lineup included headliners like Lana del Rey, Massive Attack, The National, King Princess, Young Thug, Brockhampton, The Strokes, Kacey Musgraves, Tyler, the Creator, Bad Bunny and Pavement, who were supposed to reunite for the first time since their hiatus in 2010, among others.

The lineup for the 2021 edition, which would run from June 2 to June 6 and be presented under the slogan #BestFestivalForever, was announced a year before its celebration. The lineup included most artists that were scheduled to play there in 2020. New additions to it included Gorillaz, Doja Cat, FKA Twigs, Rina Sawayama and Charli XCX among many others. In March 2021, the festival was rescheduled once again for the summer of 2022.

In May 2021, the definitive lineup for the 20th anniversary was presented as "the best one in the festival's history". New headliners include Dua Lipa, Lorde, Nick Cave & the Bad Seeds, Megan Thee Stallion and Jorja Smith. More names were added December 13, featuring additional bookings of Ride, Phoenix and Grimes among others. Headliners Massive Attack cancelled three months prior to their performance due to a member's health compilations. After discrepancies between the festival, the City Council of Barcelona and many local social groups about maintaining the two-weekend model for the future, Primavera Sound announced that the festival's 2023 edition will also take place in Arganda del Rey, near Madrid a weekend after the main ceremony.

The 2022 edition finally took place from 1 June to 12 June, combining most of the bookings from the planned 2020 and 2021 editions. The headliners for the first weekend were Pavement, Tame Impala, Beck, The National, Gorillaz, Jorja Smith, Nick Cave & the Bad Seeds and Tyler, the Creator, while the second weekend was headlined by Dua Lipa, Gorillaz, Interpol, Tyler, the Creator, Lorde, The Strokes, Jorja Smith, Megan Thee Stallion, Tame Impala, Phoenix and Yeah Yeah Yeahs. It was attended by 460,500 people, including 65% foreigners, and the average attendee spent €1,423 in Barcelona during the festival.  The 20th anniversary of Primavera Sound was considered an Event of Exceptional Public Interest by the Government's Ministry of Culture and Sports, the first international music festival in Spain to earn the distinction.

In 2022, the festival hosted its first editions in Los Angeles, São Paulo, Buenos Aires and Santiago. Plans for a Los Angeles edition had been in the works since 2019, but the original September 2020 date had to be pushed back multiple years due to COVID-19.

The poster for the 2023 edition was revealed on 29 November 2022. Presented under the slogan "I'll be your mirror", it features an almost identical lineup for the Barcelona and Madrid editions. Blur, Kendrick Lamar, Depeche Mode, Rosalía, Halsey and Calvin Harris will serve as headliners. Other performers include Ghost, Baby Keem, Måneskin, St. Vincent, FKA Twigs, Rema, Central Cee, Bleachers, Maggie Rogers, Skrillex and Tokischa among others. On 7 March 2023, New Order were announced as an additional headliner for Thursday.

International editions 
In 2012, Primavera Sound launched a sister festival in Porto, Portugal. Each year, this edition takes place one week after the main Barcelona edition and features a smaller selection of artists that play Barcelona. 

Upon the conclusion of the 2019 festival in Barcelona, Primavera Sound announced new editions in Los Angeles Historic Park in the United States, scheduled for September 2020, and London's Drumsheds venue, for June 2020. However, Primavera pulled out of the London plans over time constraints and concerns over permits and licenses. The London edition was scheduled to replace or merge with Field Day.

The first Los Angeles edition occurred from September 16–18, 2022 and was headlined by Lorde, Arctic Monkeys and Nine Inch Nails. The editions in São Paulo, Buenos Aires and Santiago all took place from October to November 2022, and were all headlined by Arctic Monkeys, Björk, Lorde and Travis Scott. It was notably Scott's first festival booking since the Astroworld Festival crowd crush. Other international performers at these editions included Arca, Beach House, Cat Power, Caroline Polachek, Charli XCX, Father John Misty, Japanese Breakfast, José González, Interpol, Mitski, and Phoebe Bridgers.

Location and festival grounds 
Primavera Sound takes place in the Parc del Fòrum, located in the south-east part of the Poblenou neighbourhood, between Barcelona and Sant Adrià de Besòs. It is accessible through public transport.

During the festival, several stages continuously host live music. These are named after the festival's sponsors. The primary stages that have been used are:

 Main Stage (sponsored by Seat) – the main stage that draws the largest crowds. This outdoor stage is where the headlining acts perform. It is located on the Plataforma Marina, a large flat terrain that was scheduled to hold a marine zoo but that remained to be a fairground and multipurpose venue after the project seemed non-viable due to the Spanish financial crisis. It includes movable stands.
 Main Stage 2 (sponsored by Pull&Bear) – also located on the Plataforma Marina, it draws large crowds and holds the biggest concerts of the night. It includes movable stands. It includes a giant led poster that says "Created in Barcelona".
Primavera Stage – a big outdoor venue used for B-list artists.
Auditori del Fòrum (sponsored by Rockdelux) – an indoor 3,000 people auditorium under the Museum of Natural Sciences of Barcelona. Holds concerts by soon-to-be big artists or artists that require the best acoustic.
Auditori Stage (sponsored by Ray-Ban) – a medium-size open air aphitheatre with a medium capacity of 3,000 people.
Seafront Stage (sponsored by Pitchfork) – a big-size venue sponsored by music magazine Pitchfork includes performances by highly recommended artists by critics.
Seafront Stage 2 (sponsored by Adidas) – a small outdoor venue used to hold little concerts.
Village Stage (sponsored by Seat) – a mid-size open-air venue orientated to electronic music. Mostly DJs perform at the venue in the early morning.
Your Stage (sponsored by Heineken) – a small-size tent used to hold the artists people have voted or asked online to play that weren't announced in the full lineup. It is, definitely, a last-minute surprise.
 Lotus Stage – located in the Fòrum Beach in Sant Adrià de Besòs with great views to the thermal power plant, it is mostly used for DJ performances.
Desperados Cube – annexed to the Lotus Stage it is used for DJ performances and for the festival's inauguration party.
OCB Paper Sessions – a small-size tent focused on showcases by small artists.
Minimusica – venue orientated to infants.
Night Pro – small-size venue it is hosted by DJs and is only accessible for press and people who have bought the Primavera Sound Pro or VIP tickets.

Stage Gallery

Festival summary by year

Porto

Los Angeles

São Paulo

Buenos Aires

Santiago

Madrid

Prizes and awards 
 Prizes of the Independent Music 2011 (organized by UFI): Better festival 
 Altaveu 2011 Award 
 Greener Festival Award 2012: in the category "Highly Commended" 
 European Festival Awards: Artists' Favourite Festival in 2014 
 Reward Waves of the Music 2014: Better musical spectacle 
 Premi Continuarà-Vespre to La2 of Culture 2015

References

External links
 Official website

 
Music festivals in Catalonia
Rock festivals in Spain
Tourist attractions in Porto
Spring (season) events in Spain
Music festivals established in 2001